South Jason is one of the Jason Islands in the north west Falkland Islands. In Spanish it is considered one of
"Islas las Llaves" (eastern, Seal Rocks and North Fur Island). Such a distinction doesn't exist in English between the two groups of the islands.

It is north west of Westpoint Island.

Falklands War

During the Falklands War, two Argentine McDonnell Douglas A-4C Skyhawks crashed on the island on 9 May 1982 - both of the pilots - Lt Jorge Casco and Lt Farias - were killed.  C313 (Lt Casco's Aircraft) was filmed just before this loss during mid-air refuelling.  On 12 January 2001 an EOD team visited the island to dispose of any live ordnance that had become apparent since their last annual visit.

He was buried on 7 March 2009  in the Argentine Military Cemetery on East Falkland. Casco's family requested that his remains be buried on the Falklands, even after they had been returned to Argentina in July 2008 for DNA testing in order to confirm their identity.

References

Jason Islands